Donald Joel Aronow (March 3, 1927 – February 3, 1987) was an American designer, builder and racer of the famous Magnum Marine, Cary, Cigarette, Donzi, and Formula speedboats.  He built speedboats for the Shah of Iran, Charles Keating, Robert Vesco, Malcolm Forbes, and George H. W. Bush. Retired President Lyndon B. Johnson owned several 16 ft. Donzi speedboats on his Texas ranch with which he would race his Secret Service agents.

Early life and education
Aronow was born in the Sheepshead Bay neighborhood of Brooklyn, the youngest son of Russian-Jewish immigrants Herman and Ruth Aronow. He had two elder sisters, Sylvia and Lillian. His father owned a gas station and then a taxi company which collapsed during the Great Depression. He graduated a top athlete from James Madison High School in 1944, worked as a life guard at Coney Island, and enrolled at Brooklyn College. In 1945, he joined the merchant marine and worked overseas until the end of World War II. In 1947, he returned to the USA and completed his studies graduating from Brooklyn College in 1948 with a physical education degree earning letters in football, wrestling, and track.

Career
After school, he worked as a physical education teacher for a time until he accepted a job at his father-in-law's southern New Jersey construction business which was booming thanks to demand from returning World War II veterans. In 1953, he established his own construction company, the Aronow Corporation which quickly became one of the largest construction companies in the state. In 1959, at age of 32, the now-millionaire Aronow moved to Miami with his family, where he began racing boats as a hobby.

The hobby evolved into a business and by the end of 1962, he had formed the Formula Marine boat company, which he then sold to Merrick Lewis' Alliance Machine Corp out of Dayton, Ohio. In 1964 he started Donzi Marine; the Donzi brand became an international success and Aronow quickly sold the company to Teleflex Inc. in mid-1965. In 1966, he founded Magnum Marine and in 1967 proceeded to win his first World Championship driving two 27' Magnums, a single engine inboard and a triple engine Mercury-powered outboard.

Since he was not supposed to be building boats in 1969, according to his non-compete clause following the sale of Magnum Marine, Aronow built the first Cigarette boat under the name Cary, with the help of Elton Cary's Miami Beach facility. 
After campaigning his boat "The Cigarette" around the world with mechanic Norris "Knocky" House as his cockpit companion, he won his second World Championship in three years, and third consecutive United States Championship while becoming only the 2nd American in history to win the UIM Gold Medal of Honor (Gar Wood was America's first UIM champion). 
Once Aronow was able to formally open his new company, he started Cigarette Racing Team using his own designs in 1970. Having sold Cigarette for the last time in 1982 (after having sold it and purchasing it back in the late 1970s while merging it with his own Squadron Marine), he formed USA Racing Team and built the Blue Thunders, 39-foot catamarans used by the United States Customs Service to patrol U.S. waters and run down illegal offshore activities, especially drug smuggling. Aronow's close friend at the time, Vice President George Bush, was a former Cigarette owner and was involved in testing out the 39-foot cats prior to government approval.

Aronow's boats won over 350 offshore races and he was a two-time world champion and three-time U.S. champion. He has been elected to every powerboating Hall of Fame in existence and as stated above, he and Gar Wood were the only two Americans to have ever received the UIM Gold Medal of Honor.

Murder
The great speed of Cigarette boats also made them a popular choice among cocaine smugglers. On February 3, 1987, Aronow was murdered in his car at the end of 188th Street in North Miami Beach where his boat companies operated. Aronow had just left a meeting with Bob Saccenti, part owner of Apache Power Boats together with partner Ben Kramer. Witnesses said a powder blue Lincoln pulled up next to Aronow's car from the opposite direction, and when Aronow rolled down its window the driver opened fire. Another witness tried to follow the Lincoln as it fled but could not catch the killer(s). The Lincoln drove over the grass to get away.

Nearly a decade later, two men pleaded no contest to charges related to Aronow's killing.  In 1995, career criminal Bobby Young admitted to shooting Aronow and pleaded no contest to second degree murder, eventually providing a full confession in 2009 shortly before his death.  Ben Kramer, winner of the 1986 American Power Boat Association Offshore Championship, pleaded no contest to manslaughter in 1996.  Kramer had a business dispute with Aronow after buying the latter's USA Racing Team but was forced to sell it back to Aronow after the Customs Service refused to do business with him.  Kramer was already in prison on a life sentence with no possibility of parole following 1988 and 1989 convictions for drug smuggling and gun charges, as well as receiving a 1990 conviction for a failed escape attempt by helicopter from a federal prison near Miami.

The story was also the basis for the 2009 documentary film Thunder Man: The Don Aronow Story and the 2018 movie Speed Kills with John Travolta.

Personal life
Aronow married twice. 
In 1948, he married Shirley Goldin, whom he had met while working as a lifeguard on Coney Island. They had three children:
Michael who was a star athlete at the University of Florida until he was severely injured in a car accident in 1970 and used a wheelchair after that.
David
Claudia is a New York artist and ex-wife of real estate developer Martin Kimmel. Their son is menswear designer Adam Kimmel, who is married to the actress Leelee Sobieski.
His second wife was former Wilhelmina model, Lillian Crawford, 24 years his junior. They had two sons, Gavin and Wylie.
Wylie is one of the cofounders of Bored Ape Yacht Club, a prominent NFT collection.

References

Further reading
 Don Aronow: The King of Thunderboat Row, 1994, by Michael Aronow
 Historic Offshore Race Boat Association - Donald Aronow
 Blue Thunder: How the Mafia Owned and Finally Murdered Cigarette Boat King Donald Aronow, 1990, Thomas Burdick and Charlene Mitchell
 
 "The Murder of Speedboat Builder Don Aronow", Matt Meltzer, Miami Beach 411, September 18, 2007
 "Rock around the States: Don Aronow" by Antonio Soccol
 "30 for 30 Shorts: Collision Course" Documentary on Aronow's Murder

1927 births
1987 deaths
American boat builders
American people of Russian-Jewish descent
Murdered American Jews
Deaths by firearm in Florida
People murdered in Florida
Male murder victims
James Madison High School (Brooklyn) alumni
Brooklyn College alumni